A by-election was held for the New South Wales Legislative Assembly electorate of Clarence on 19 November 2011, following the resignation from parliament on 16 September of Steve Cansdell. Despite a large two-party-preferred swing, Nationals candidate Chris Gulaptis retained the seat.

Background
Steve Cansdell resigned from parliament after admitting to making a false statutory declaration regarding a speeding offence.
Eight candidates contested the by-election including Nationals candidate Chris Gulaptis who previously contested the federal seat of Page at the 2007 federal election, and Labor candidate Peter Ellem. One of the main issues of the campaign was coal seam gas (CSG) production. Labor accused the Coalition government of putting the environment at risk by not ruling out future CSG, while resources minister Chris Hartcher claimed that "Every CSG licence that exists in NSW was granted by the Labor government of which John Robertson was a minister". Other issues in the campaign were more local, with candidates jousting over ways to create more jobs in Grafton and reduce crime in Casino.

Results

Steve Cansdell resigned.

The Nationals suffered a 16-point two-party-preferred swing, but since Clarence was already a very safe National seat, Gulaptis retained the seat for the Nationals with a majority of 15 percentage points.

See also
Electoral results for the district of Clarence
List of New South Wales state by-elections

References

2011 elections in Australia
New South Wales state by-elections
2010s in New South Wales
November 2011 events in Australia